Catalase-peroxidase (katG (gene)) is an enzyme with systematic name donor:hydrogen-peroxide oxidoreductase. This enzyme catalyses the following chemical reaction

 donor + H2O2   oxidized donor + 2 H2O
 2 H2O2   O2 + 2 H2O

This enzyme is a strong catalase with H2O2 as donor which releases O2.

References

External links 
 

EC 1.11.1